Inquisitor latifasciata is a species of sea snail, a marine gastropod mollusk in the family Pseudomelatomidae, the turrids and allies.

Description

Distribution
This marine species was found off Hong Kong

References

 Sowerby II, G. B. (1870). Descriptions of forty-eight new species of shells. Proceedings of the Zoological Society of London. (1870): 249–259
 Leung KF. & Morton B. (2003). Effects of long-term anthropogenic perturbations on three subtidal epibenthic molluscan communities in Hong Kong. In: Morton B, editor. Proceedings of an International Workshop Reunion Conference, Hong Kong: Perspectives on Marine Environment Change in Hong Kong and Southern China, 1977-2001. Hong Kong University Press, Hong Kong. pp 655-717
 Liu J.Y. [Ruiyu] (ed.). (2008). Checklist of marine biota of China seas. China Science Press. 1267 pp

External links
  Baoquan Li 李宝泉 & R.N. Kilburn, Report on Crassispirinae Morrison, 1966 (Mollusca: Neogastropoda: Turridae) from the China Seas; Journal of Natural History 44(11):699-740 · March 2010; DOI: 10.1080/00222930903470086
  Tucker, J.K. 2004 Catalog of recent and fossil turrids (Mollusca: Gastropoda). Zootaxa 682:1–1295

latifasciata
Gastropods described in 1870